The Royal Society of Chemistry grants a number of medals and awards.

All those named "prize" (except the Beilby Medal and Prize) are awarded with a £5,000 bursary. The Chemistry World Entrepreneur of the Year award has one of £4,000.

As of 2014, these are:
 Applied Catalysis Award
 Applied Inorganic Chemistry Award
 Apprentice of the Year Award
 Bader Award
 Geoffrey Barker Medal
 Barrer Award
 Sir Derek Barton Gold Medal
 Beilby Medal and Prize
 Ronald Belcher Award
 Anne Bennett Memorial Award for Distinguished Service
 Becquerel Medal
 Bill Newton Award
 Bioinorganic Chemistry Award
 Bioorganic Chemistry Award
 Materials for Industry - Derek Birchall Award
 Joseph Black Award
 Bourke Award
 Robert Boyle Prize for Analytical Science
 S F Boys-A Rahman Award
 Catalysis in Organic Chemistry Award
 Centenary Prize
 Joseph Chatt Award
 Chemical Dynamics Award
 Chemistry of Transition Metals Award
 Chemistry World Entrepreneur of the Year
 Corday-Morgan Prizes
 Rita and John Cornforth Award
 Creativity in Industry Prize
 Dalton Young Researchers Award
 Peter Day Award
 De Gennes Prize
 Education Award
 Environment Prize
 Environment, Sustainability and Energy Division Early Career Award
 Faraday Lectureship Prize
 Faraday Medal (electrochemistry)
 Frankland Award
 Sir Edward Frankland Fellowship
 Gibson-Fawcett award
 John B. Goodenough Award
 Green Chemistry Award
 Harrison-Meldola Memorial Prizes
 Haworth Memorial Lectureship
 Norman Heatley Award
 Hickinbottom Award
 Higher Education Teaching Award
 Homogeneous Catalysis Award
 Industrial Analytical Science Award
 Inorganic Mechanisms Awards
 Inspiration and Industry
 Interdisciplinary Prizes
 John Jeyes Award
 Khorana Prize
 Jeremy Knowles Award
 Lord Lewis Prize
 Liversidge Award
 Longstaff Prize
 Main Group Chemistry Award
 Marlow Award
 Merck Award
 Ludwig Mond Award
 Natural Product Chemistry Award
 Nyholm Prize for Education
 Nyholm Prize for Inorganic Chemistry
 Organic Industrial Chemistry Award
 Organic Stereochemistry Award
 Organometallic Chemistry Award
 Pedler Award
 Perkin Prize for Organic Chemistry
 Physical Organic Chemistry Award
 Theophilus Redwood Award
 Radiochemistry Group Young Researcher's Award
 Charles Rees Award
 Robert Robinson Award
 Schools Education Award
 Soft Matter and Biophysical Chemistry Award
 George and Christine Sosnovsky Award in Cancer Therapy
 Sir George Stokes Award
 Supramolecular Chemistry Award
 Surfaces and Interfaces Award
 Sustainable Energy Award
 Sustainable Water Award
 Synthetic Organic Chemistry Award
 Teamwork in Innovation
 Technician of the Year Award (Higher Education and Research)
 Technician of the Year Award (Industry)
 Tilden Prizes
 Toxicology Award
 Rising Star in Industry Award

Discontinued awards (incomplete list)
 Hugo Müller Lectureship, discontinued 2008
 Solid State Chemistry Award, discontinued 2008

See also

 Honorary Fellows of the Royal Society of Chemistry

References